Bachia oxyrhina is a species of lizard in the family Gymnophthalmidae. It is endemic to Brazil.

References

Bachia
Reptiles of Brazil
Endemic fauna of Brazil
Reptiles described in 2008
Taxa named by Miguel Trefaut Rodrigues
Taxa named by Augustín Camacho Guerrero
Taxa named by Pedro M. Sales-Nunes
Taxa named by Renato Recoder
Taxa named by Mauro Teixeira Jr.
Taxa named by Paula H. Valdujo
Taxa named by Jose Mario B. Ghellere
Taxa named by Tami Mott
Taxa named by Cristiano Nogueira